King's Church London is an evangelical church based in Kings Church at Catford in London. It reaches out to communities in South East London and is involved in church planting. It has planted two churches in south east London, Beacon Church in Streatham and Emmanuel Church in Greenwich. It has also sent pastors to plant churches in Chatham and sponsored ChristChurch London. It has also done charitable work around Lewisham such as renting houses to the homeless and holding a feast for homeless people in the community.

King's is part of Newfrontiers, an international family of churches and they also run Newfrontiers churches in London. The church is run by Steve Tibbert who aims for the church to have a thousand members. The church is rather successful since it has six services during the day. It has turned into a multisite and has buildings in Downham and Lee.

Gavin Peacock, Sir Steve Bullock, Stephen Timms, Jim Dowd, Sybil Phoenix and Terry Virgo are visitors of King's. Sybil Phoenix is a recurring member.

External links
 King's Church website
 Mercy Giver album website
 Kings Worship blog 
 Beacon Church website
 Emmanuel Church website
 Steve Tibbert's Leadership blog
 Newfrontiers website

Newfrontiers
Evangelical churches in London
Religion in the London Borough of Lewisham
Churches in the London Borough of Lewisham
Catford